The Essential Pavarotti is an album by tenor Luciano Pavarotti. It was released in 1990 by Decca Records and peaked at number one on the UK Albums Chart, the first ever classical album to do so.

Track listing
Rigoletto / Act 3 - "La donna è mobile"	
La Bohème / Act 1 - "Che gelida manina"	
Tosca / Act 3 - "E lucevan le stelle"	
Turandot / Act 3 - Nessun dorma!
L'elisir d'amore / Act 2 - "Una furtiva lagrima"
Martha / Act 3 - "M'appari"
Carmen / Act 2 - "La fleur que tu m'avais jetée"
Pagliacci / Act 1 - "Vesti la giubba"
Il Trovatore / Act 3 - "Di quella pira"
Caruso
Mattinata
Aprile
Core 'ngrato
Soirées musicales - La Danza
Volare
Funiculì, funiculà
Torna a Surriento
'O sole mio

Charts

Certifications

References

1990 classical albums
Luciano Pavarotti albums
Decca Records compilation albums